Lords of Dogtown: Music from the Motion Picture is the 2005 soundtrack album for the movie Lords of Dogtown.

Track listing 
"Death or Glory" by Social Distortion (The Clash cover)
"Hair of the Dog" by Nazareth
"I Just Want to Make Love to You" by Foghat
"Fox on the Run" by Sweet
"Motor City Madhouse" by Ted Nugent
"Turn to Stone" by Joe Walsh
"One Way Out" by The Allman Brothers Band
"Fire" by The Jimi Hendrix Experience
"Space Truckin'" by Deep Purple
"Success" by Iggy Pop
"Suffragette City" by David Bowie
"Iron Man" by Black Sabbath
"Nervous Breakdown" by Rise Against (Black Flag cover)
"20th Century Boy" by T.Rex
"Maggie May" by Rod Stewart
"Wish You Were Here" by Sparklehorse & Thom Yorke (Pink Floyd cover)

Songs that were featured in the movie but not on the soundtrack album
"Half-Breed" by Cher
"Cat Scratch Fever" by Ted Nugent
"Old Man" by Neil Young
"Voodoo Chile" by The Jimi Hendrix Experience
"Steppin' Razor" by Peter Tosh
"Daydream" by Robin Trower
"Loose" by The Stooges
"Jackie Blue" by Ozark Mountain Daredevils
"Long Way to Go" by Alice Cooper
"Shambala" by Three Dog Night
"Sidewalk Surfin'" by Jan & Dean
"Walking in Rhythm" by The Blackbyrds
"The Red and the Black" by Blue Öyster Cult
"Mongoloid" by Devo
"Too High" by Stevie Wonder
"Brandy (You're a Fine Girl)" by Looking Glass
"Super Stupid" by Funkadelic
"Crash Course in Brain Surgery" by Budgie
"Fire" by Ohio Players
"Stay With Me" by Faces
"T.V. Eye" by The Stooges
"Strange Brew" by Cream
"Also Sprach Zarathustra" by Eumir Deodato
"Solitary Confinement" by The Weirdos
"Boulevard of Broken Dreams" by Green Day (featured only in the movie trailer)
"No Reason by Sum 41 (featured only in TV commercials for the movie)

References

Biographical film soundtracks
2005 soundtrack albums
Geffen Records soundtracks
Rock soundtracks